The Sacred Heart Seminary and School of Theology is a Roman Catholic seminary in Hales Corners, Wisconsin.  It is associated with the Priests of the Sacred Heart, a Catholic religious community of priests and lay brothers founded in France in 1884 and in the US in the early 20th century.

When the seminary program was established in 1932, the school was known as Sacred Heart Monastery. It offered classes in philosophy and theology for seminarians who were members of the Priests of the Sacred Heart.

The seminary is accredited by the Association of Theological Schools in the United States and Canada and the Higher Learning Commission. It is the largest seminary in the United States that trains men over the age of 30 for the priesthood.

Sacred Heart is also home to The Lux Center for Catholic-Jewish Studies, established in 2010 as a tribute to the life’s work of Dr. Richard Lux, professor of biblical studies for thirty-seven years. Lux emerged as an important national voice in promoting understanding and respect between Catholics and Jews. The Lux Center continues this work as the only such center in the world working within the Catholic seminary context of priestly formation. Its current interim director is Jon M. Sweeney.

History
In its early programs beginning in 1932, the seminary offered both philosophy and theology classes to seminarians affiliated with Priests of the Sacred Heart, which included laymen. In 1955, the philosophy program was moved elsewhere. The seminary was dedicated to theological preparation for men preparing for priesthood.

In 1968, construction of the existing building was completed across the street from the original school. In 1972 the name was changed to Sacred Heart School of Theology.

In 1973 Sacred Heart received approval to accept second-career presbyteral candidates who are sponsored by dioceses or religious congregations. It is the largest seminary in the US to accept men over the age of 30 for training for the priesthood. The candidates come from across the United States and Canada. The seminary offers a Master of Divinity to men who are in a program of priestly formation.

It also offers a Master of Arts for men and women seeking theological training in a Christian tradition.

References

External links
Official website

Catholic seminaries in the United States
Catholic Church in Wisconsin
Seminaries and theological colleges in Wisconsin
Education in Milwaukee County, Wisconsin
Educational institutions established in 1932
Buildings and structures in Milwaukee County, Wisconsin
Roman Catholic Archdiocese of Milwaukee
1932 establishments in Wisconsin